Saint Anselm Abbey, located in Goffstown, New Hampshire, United States, is a Benedictine abbey composed of men living under the Rule of Saint Benedict within the Catholic Church. The abbey was founded in 1889 under the patronage of Saint Anselm of Canterbury, a Benedictine monk of Bec and former archbishop of Canterbury in England. The monks are involved in the operation of Saint Anselm College. The abbey is a member of the American-Cassinese Congregation of the Benedictine Confederation.

Foundation
In 1889, Denis M. Bradley, the first bishop of Manchester, New Hampshire, requested that Abbot Boniface Wimmer send monks to his diocese to create a school for French and Irish immigrants. The bishop thought that in order to create harmony among the people of his diocese the best educators for them should be German. Monks from Saint Mary's Abbey in Newark, New Jersey, were sent to found Saint Anselm Abbey in 1889.  When they arrived they founded St. Raphael's Parish in Manchester, and they founded Saint Anselm Preparatory School, which would later evolve into Saint Anselm College.

Buildings
The present main abbey building was completed in 1955 to designs by Manchester architects Koehler & Isaak in the Colonial Revival style. The same architects added the adjacent abbey church in 1965 and designed much of the college campus.

Saint Anselm College
Saint Anselm College is a nationally ranked Catholic liberal arts college in Goffstown, New Hampshire. The monks of Saint Anselm Abbey are heavily involved in the life and operation of the college. Serving as administrators, as faculty and staff members, and on the college's Board of Trustees, the monastery's approximately 30 monks fulfill their monastic calling in the work they do.

Abbots
From the time of its founding in 1889 until 1927, when it became an independent abbey, Saint Anselm was a dependent priory of  Saint Mary's Abbey in Newark, New Jersey. The abbots of Saint Mary's were also the spiritual superiors of Saint Anselm. Those abbots were Abbot Hilary Pfraengle and Abbot Ernest Helmstetter.

Since its elevation to the status of an independent institution, Saint Anselm has been led by five men:
Abbot Bertrand Dolan, O.S.B. - In 1927, Saint Anselm Priory was elevated to an abbey by Pope Pius XI. Abbot President Ernest Helmstetter, president of the American-Cassinese Congregation, conducted the first abbatial election, and the monks in solemn vows elected Fr. Bertrand Dolan, O.S.B. as first abbot of Saint Anselm Abbey.
Abbot Gerald McCarthy, O.S.B. - Abbot Gerald was elected coadjutor abbot in 1963 at Abbot Bertrand's request. Following the death of Abbot Bertrand in 1968, Abbot Gerald became the Abbot of Saint Anselm. His abbatial blessing was celebrated on September 3, 1963, by Bishop Ernest John Primeau of Manchester. Abbot Gerald retired from his abbatial duties due to declining health shortly before Christmas of 1971.

Bishop Joseph John Gerry, O.S.B. - Bishop Joseph professed first vows as a member of Saint Anselm Abbey on July 2, 1948, following his novitiate at Saint Vincent Archabbey in Latrobe, Pennsylvania. He was ordained to the priesthood in St. Joseph's Cathedral, Manchester, by Bishop Matthew Francis Brady on June 12, 1954. He was named Subprior of the Abbey in 1959 and Prior in 1963, a position he held until 1971. On January 6, 1972, he was elected third abbot of Saint Anselm Abbey, a position he held until his appointment as Auxiliary Bishop of Manchester by Pope John Paul II. On February 21, 1989 he was installed as the 10th Bishop of Portland, Maine. The principal celebrant was Bernard Cardinal Law, Archbishop of Boston. The event took place at the Cathedral of the Immaculate Conception in Portland.  Bishop Joseph retired on February 4, 2004, and returned to Saint Anselm Abbey where he currently resides.
Abbot Matthew K. Leavy, O.S.B. - Abbot Matthew, a native of the Bronx, New York, took vows as a monk in 1968. Ordained to the priesthood in 1975, and having held various responsibilities in the monastery and at Saint Anselm College, he was elected the fourth Abbot of Saint Anselm Abbey on March 4, 1986, at the age of 35, after Abbot Joseph John Gerry's elevation to Auxiliary Bishop of Manchester.  Before being elected Abbot, he was the Prior of the Abbey. Abbot Matthew retired from his position as Abbot and Chancellor of Saint Anselm College on June 5, 2012.

Abbot Mark Cooper, O.S.B. - On June 5, 2012, Abbot Mark Cooper was elected as the fifth Abbot of Saint Anselm Abbey. By virtue of his election, he consequently becomes Chancellor of Saint Anselm College. Previous to his election he managed Saint Anselm College's finances for 33 years and was set to retire as the treasurer and vice president of financial affairs. Abbot Mark professed vows as a member of the Benedictine community at Saint Anselm in 1972 and was ordained to the priesthood in 1976. He earned his bachelor's degree in political science in 1971 from Saint Anselm College. He earned an M.S.A. in business administration from the University of Notre Dame. He studied at Saint John's Seminary in Boston and St. Albert's Seminary in Oakland, California. He taught at Woodside Priory in California and received an Alumni Award of Merit in 2003 for his contributions to the growth of Saint Anselm College. Abbot Mark was officially blessed as the Abbot of Saint Anselm Abbey on September 10, 2012 by his uncle Bishop Joseph Gerry, O.S.B. in the presence of the Bishop of Manchester, Peter Libasci.

Community song
On feast days and at the graveside during burial of members of the community, the monastic community sings the hymn of the American-Cassinese Congregation known as the "Ultima". The hymn is sung a cappella in Latin through once, then the final two lines are repeated.

Gallery

References

External links
Saint Anselm Abbey official website
American Cassinese Congregation
Benedictine Confederation

Benedictine monasteries in the United States
Roman Catholic Diocese of Manchester
Christianity in New Hampshire
Saint Anselm College
Educational institutions established in 1889
1889 establishments in New Hampshire